The CircuitCity.com 250 presented by Tamron was a 250-lap, 218.75-mile NASCAR Xfinity Series race which has been held every spring since 2011 at Iowa Speedway in Newton, Iowa, in either May or June. It had different title sponsor almost every year, with the sponsor being Circuit City in the last year. The inaugural race was held in 2011, and was won by Ricky Stenhouse Jr.

The race was canceled in 2020 due to the COVID-19 pandemic before being removed entirely in 2021.

Past winners

2013: The DuPont Pioneer 250 was scheduled to be held on June 8, 2013, was postponed to June 9 after multiple rain showers soaked the track.
2015: Race extended due to a green–white–checker finish.
2020: Race cancelled and moved to Homestead-Miami due to the COVID-19 pandemic.

Multiple winners (drivers)

Multiple winners (teams)

Manufacturer wins

References

External links
 

2011 establishments in Iowa
2020 establishments in Iowa
NASCAR Xfinity Series races
Former NASCAR races
 
Recurring sporting events established in 2011
Recurring sporting events disestablished in 2020